The 1930 Glasgow Shettleston by-election was held on 26 June 1930.  The by-election was held due to the death of the incumbent Labour MP, John Wheatley.  It was won by the Labour candidate John McGovern.  Allegations that McGovern had rigged the Labour party candidate selection for the by-election were to lead to his expulsion from the Labour Party, although he would retain the seat as an Independent Labour Party MP.

References

Glasgow Shettleston by-election
Glasgow Shettleston by-election
1930s elections in Scotland
1930s in Glasgow
Glasgow Shettleston by-election
Shettleston, 1930